Florica (Floarea) Leonida (born January 13, 1987 in Bucharest, Romania) is a retired Romanian artistic gymnast. She is a silver world medalist  and a silver European medalist with the team. She was a successful junior gymnast winning gold on beam and three silver medals (all around, floor and team) at the 2002 Junior European Championships.

References

1987 births
Living people
Gymnasts from Bucharest
Romanian female artistic gymnasts
European champions in gymnastics
Medalists at the World Artistic Gymnastics Championships
21st-century Romanian women